Gabonese Olympic Committee (IOC code: GAB) is the National Olympic Committee representing Gabon.

See also
 Gabon at the Olympics

References

Gabon
Gabon at the Olympics